Darko Vukić (born 2 December 1968 in Yugoslavia) is a Croatian former footballer played as a midfielder.

International career
He played once for Croatia, in an April 1994 friendly match away against Slovakia.

Honours
Mexico Primera Division: Invierno 1998, Verano 1999

References

External links
 
 

1968 births
Living people
Footballers from Zagreb
Association football midfielders
Croatia international footballers
Yugoslav footballers
Croatian footballers
NK Zagreb players
Nîmes Olympique players
Hapoel Haifa F.C. players
Deportivo Toluca F.C. players
Atlético Celaya footballers
Atlético Mexiquense footballers
San Luis F.C. players
Ligue 2 players
Liga Leumit players
Liga MX players
Croatian expatriate footballers
Expatriate footballers in France
Expatriate footballers in Israel
Expatriate footballers in Mexico
Croatian expatriate sportspeople in France
Croatian expatriate sportspeople in Israel
Croatian expatriate sportspeople in Mexico